An oratorio is a large musical composition for orchestra, choir, and soloists. Like most operas, an oratorio includes the use of a choir, soloists, an instrumental ensemble, various distinguishable characters, and arias. However, opera is musical theatre, while oratorio is strictly a concert piece – though oratorios are sometimes staged as operas, and operas are sometimes presented in concert form. In an oratorio, the choir often plays a central role, and there is generally little or no interaction between the characters, and no props or elaborate costumes. A particularly important difference is in the typical subject matter of the text. Opera tends to deal with history and mythology, including age-old devices of romance, deception, and murder, whereas the plot of an oratorio often deals with sacred topics, making it appropriate for performance in the church. Protestant composers took their stories from the Bible, while Catholic composers looked to the lives of saints, as well as to Biblical topics. Oratorios became extremely popular in early 17th-century Italy partly because of the success of opera and the Catholic Church's prohibition of spectacles during Lent. Oratorios became the main choice of music during that period for opera audiences.

History

Etymology
The word oratorio comes from the Latin verb orare, to pray. Hence oratory. The musical composition was "named from the kind of musical services held in the church of the Oratory of St. Philip Neri in Rome (Congregazione dell'Oratorio) in the latter half of the 16th cent."

1600, origins
Although medieval plays such as the Ludus Danielis and Renaissance dialogue motets such as those of the Oltremontani had characteristics of an oratorio, the first oratorio is usually seen as Emilio de Cavalieri's Rappresentatione di Anima, et di Corpo. Monteverdi composed Il Combattimento di Tancredi e Clorinda which can be considered as the first secular oratorio.

The origins of the oratorio can be found in sacred dialogues in Italy. These were settings of Biblical, Latin texts and musically were quite similar to motets. There was a strong narrative, dramatic emphasis and there were conversational exchanges between characters in the work. Giovanni Francesco Anerio's Teatro harmonico spirituale (1619) is a set of 14 dialogues, the longest of which is 20 minutes long and covers the conversion of St. Paul and is for four soloists: Historicus (narrator), tenor; St. Paul, tenor; Voice from Heaven, bass; and Ananias, tenor. There is also a four-part chorus to represent any crowds in the drama. The music is often contrapuntal and madrigal-like.
Philip Neri's Congregazione dell'Oratorio featured the singing of spiritual laude. These became more and more popular and were eventually performed in specially built oratories (prayer halls) by professional musicians. Again, these were chiefly based on dramatic and narrative elements.
Sacred opera provided another impetus for dialogues, and they greatly expanded in length (although never really beyond 60 minutes long). Cavalieri's Rappresentatione di Anima, et di Corpo is an example of one of these works, but technically it is not an oratorio because it features acting and dancing. It does, however contain music in the monodic style.
The first oratorio to be called by that name is Pietro della Valle's Oratorio della Purificazione, but due to its brevity (only 12 minutes long) and the fact that its other name was "dialogue", we can see that there was much ambiguity in these names.

1650–1700
During the second half of the 17th century, there were trends toward the secularization of the religious oratorio. Evidence of this lies in its regular performance outside church halls in courts and public theaters. Whether religious or secular, the theme of an oratorio is meant to be weighty. It could include such topics as Creation, the life of Jesus, or the career of a classical hero or Biblical prophet. Other changes eventually took place as well, possibly because most composers of oratorios were also popular composers of operas. They began to publish the librettos of their oratorios as they did for their operas. Strong emphasis was soon placed on arias while the use of the choir diminished. Female singers became regularly employed, and replaced the male narrator with the use of recitatives.

By the mid-17th century, two types had developed:

 oratorio latino (in Latin) – first developed at the Oratorio del Santissimo Crocifisso, related to the church of San Marcello al Corso in Rome.

The most significant composers of oratorio latino were in Italy Giacomo Carissimi, whose Jephte is regarded as the first masterpiece of the genre (like most other Latin oratorios of the period, it is in one section only), and in France Carissimi's pupil Marc-Antoine Charpentier (34 works H.391 - H.425).

 oratorio volgare (in Italian) – representative examples include:
 Giacomo Carissimi's Daniele
 Marco Marazzoli's S Tomaso
 similar works written by Francesco Foggia, Luigi Rossi, Alessandro Stradella

Lasting about 30–60 minutes, oratori volgari were performed in two sections, separated by a sermon; their music resembles that of contemporary operas and chamber cantatas.

Late baroque
In the late baroque period oratorios increasingly became "sacred opera". In Rome and Naples Alessandro Scarlatti was the most noted composer. In Vienna the court poet Metastasio produced annually a series of oratorios for the court which were set by Caldara, Hasse and others. Metastasio's best known oratorio libretto La passione di Gesù Cristo was set by at least 35 composers from 1730–90. In Germany the middle baroque oratorios moved from the early-baroque Historia style Christmas and Resurrection settings of Heinrich Schütz, to the Passions of J. S. Bach, oratorio-passions such as Der Tod Jesu set by Telemann and Carl Heinrich Graun. After Telemann came the galante oratorio style of C. P. E. Bach.

Georgian Britain

The Georgian era saw a German-born monarch and German-born composer define the English oratorio. George Frideric Handel, most famous today for his Messiah (1741), also wrote other oratorios based on themes from Greek and Roman mythology and Biblical topics. He is also credited with writing the first English language oratorio, Esther. Handel's imitators included the Italian Lidarti who was employed by the Amsterdam Jewish community to compose a Hebrew version of Esther.

Victorian era
Britain continued to look to Germany for its composers of oratorio. The Birmingham Festival commissioned various oratorios including Felix Mendelssohn's Elijah in 1846, later performed in German as Elias. German composer Georg Vierling is noted for modernizing the secular oratorio form.

John Stainer's The Crucifixion (1887) became the stereotypical battlehorse of massed amateur choral societies. Edward Elgar tried to revive the genre around the turn of century with the composition of The Light of Life (Lux Christi), The Dream of Gerontius, The Apostles and The Kingdom.

20th century
Oratorio returned haltingly to public attention with Igor Stravinsky's Oedipus Rex in Paris (1927), William Walton's Belshazzar's Feast in Leeds (1931), Paul Hindemith's Das Unaufhörliche in Berlin (1931), Arthur Honegger's Le Roi David and Jeanne d'Arc au bûcher in Basel (1938), and Franz Schmidt's The Book with Seven Seals (Das Buch mit sieben Siegeln) in Vienna (1938). Michael Tippett's oratorio A Child of Our Time (first performance, 1944) engages with events surrounding the Second World War. Postwar oratorios include Dmitri Shostakovich's Song of the Forests (1949), Sergei Prokofiev's On Guard for Peace (1950), Vadim Salmanov's Twelve (1957), Alfred Schnittke's Nagasaki (1958), Bohuslav Martinů's The Epic of Gilgamesh (1958), Krzysztof Penderecki's St. Luke Passion (1966),   Hans Werner Henze's Das Floß der Medusa (1968), René Clemencic's Kabbala (1992), and Osvaldo Golijov's La Pasión según San Marcos (2000). Mauricio Kagel composed Sankt-Bach-Passion, an oratorio about Bach's life, for the tercentenary of his birth in 1985.

Oratorios by popular musicians include Léo Ferré's La Chanson du mal-aimé (1954 and 1972), based on Guillaume Apollinaire's poem of the same name, Paul McCartney's Liverpool Oratorio (1991) and Mikis Theodorakis's Canto General and Axion Esti based on poems of Pablo Neruda and Odusseas Elytis.

21st century
When Dudley Buck composed his oratorio The Light of Asia in 1886, it became the first in the history of the genre to be based on the life of Buddha. Several late 20th and early 21st-century oratorios have since been based on Buddha's life or have incorporated Buddhist texts. These include Somei Satoh's 1987 Stabat Mater, Dinesh Subasinghe's 2010 Karuna Nadee, and Jonathan Harvey's 2011 Weltethos. The 21st century also saw a continuation of Christianity-based oratorios with John Adams's El Niño and The Gospel According to the Other Mary. Other religions represented include Ilaiyaraaja's  Thiruvasakam (based on the texts of Hindu hymns to Shiva). Secular oratorios composed in the 21st century include Nathan Currier's Gaian Variations (based on the Gaia hypothesis), Richard Einhorn's The Origin (based on the writings of Charles Darwin), Jonathan Mills' Sandakan Threnody (based on the Sandakan Death Marches), and Neil Hannon's To Our Fathers in Distress. The oratorio Laudato si', composed in 2016 by Peter Reulein on a libretto by Helmut Schlegel, includes the full Latin text of the Magnificat, expanded by writings of Clare of Assisi, Francis of Assisi and Pope Francis. Bruder Martin was composed by Thomas Gabriel, setting a text by Eugen Eckert about scenes from the life of Martin Luther, for the 500th anniversary of the Reformation in 2017.

See also
 List of oratorios
 Passion
 Music for the Requiem Mass
 Mass (liturgy)
 Mass (music)
 Oratorio Society (disambiguation)

References

 Bukofzer, Manfred F. Music in the Baroque Era. New York, NY: W.W. Norton and Co., Inc, 1947.
 Smither, Howard. The History of the Oratorio. vol. 1–4, Chapel Hill, NC: Univ. of N.C. Press, 1977–2000.
 Deedy, John. The Catholic Fact Book. Chicago, IL: Thomas Moore Press, 1986.
 Grove Music Online, ed. L. Macy, grovemusic.com (subscription access).
 Hardon, John A. Modern Catholic Dictionary. Garden City, NY: Doubleday and Co. Inc., 1980.
 New Catholic Encyclopedia. New York: McGraw-Hill, 1967.
 Randel, Don. "Oratorio". The Harvard Dictionary of Music. Cambridge, MA: The Belknap Press, 1986.
 McGuire, Charles Edward. Elgar's Oratorios: The Creation of an Epic Narrative. Aldershot: Ashgate Press, 2002.
 McGuire, Charles Edward. "Elgar, Judas, and the Theology of Betrayal." In 19th-Century Music, vol. XXIII, no. 3 (Spring, 2000), pp. 236–272.
 Upton, George P. The Standard Oratorios, Chicago, 1893

 
Classical music styles